= Christian Democratic Party of Iran =

Christian Democratic Party of Iran حزب دموکرات مسیحی ایران
- First Secretary: Behrouz Ghorbani
- Founded: 2009; 17 years ago
- Headquarters: Norway
- Ideology: Secularism; Liberalism; Republicanism
- National affiliation: National Council decided

Website
- https://www.democraticmasihi.com/

Christian Democratic Party of Iran is a liberal and nationalist Iranian political party founded in exile in September 2009.

The current first secretary of the Christian Democratic Party of Iran is Behrouz Ghorbani.

This party is a member of the National Council of Decisions.
